The Missouri Tigers baseball team represents the University of Missouri in NCAA Division I college baseball. The Missouri Tigers had an overall record of 2053-1339-17 entering the 2012 season.

Head coaches

Year-by-year record

CB=Collegiate Baseball
BA=Baseball America

Conference membership
 1891–1928: No conference
 1929–1996: Big Eight Conference (known as Big Six 1929–46 and Big Seven 1947–57)
 1997–2012: Big 12 Conference
 2013–present: Southeastern Conference

Missouri in the NCAA Tournament

All-time series records against Big 12 members

Retired jersey numbers
 John 'Hi' Simmons #34
 Gene McArtor #33
 Phil Bradley #15
 Max Scherzer #31

Individual awards

National awards
 Roger Clemens Award
Aaron Crow – 2008

All-Americans

 1931
Sam Carter, SS
Norm Wagner, P
 1952
Don Boenker, P
Kent Kurtz, 3B
Junior Wren, OF
 1954
Jerry Schoonmaker, OF
 1957
Jack Davis, OF
 1958
Sonny Siebert, 1B
Bo Toft, OF
Ray Uriarte, 3B
 1959
Ralph Hochgrebe, 2B
 1960
Ron Cox, SS
Gene Orf, OF
 1961
Gene Orf, OF
 1963
Dave Harvey, 3B
John Sevcik, C
 1964
Dave Harvey, 3B
Keith Weber, P
 1965
Dan Rudanovich, OF
Bob Robben, SS
 1967
Ray Thorpe, OF

 1974
Mark Thiel, C
 1975
Greg Cypret, SS
 1976
Greg Cypret, SS
Mark Thiel, C
 1978
Greg Cypret, SS
 1980
Lindy Duncan, SS
 1981
Phil Bradley, OF
Tom Heckman, P
 1985
Dave Otto, DH
 1987
Dave Silvestri, SS
 1988
Dave Silvestri, SS
 1991
John Dettmer, P
 1994
David Sanderson, OF
 1996
Aaron Jaworowski, 1B
Aaron Akin, P (Freshman)
Logan Dale, P (Freshman)
Justin Stine, P (Freshman)
Jason Williams, INF (Freshman)

 1998
Ryan Fry, P
 1999
Ryan Stegall, SS (Freshman)
 2000
Ryan Stegall, SS
Jayce Tingler, OF (Freshman)
 2001
Lee Laskowski, OF (Freshman)
 2002
Travis Wendte, P (Freshman)
 2004
Garrett Broshuis, P
 2005
Max Scherzer, P
James Boone, OF
Jacob Priday, OF (Freshman)
 2007
Trevor Coleman, C (Freshman)
 2008
Aaron Crow, P
Jacob Priday, DH
 2009
Kyle Gibson, P
 2010
Aaron Senne, 1B

All-College World Series

 1958
Sonny Siebert, 1B (1940s–50s All-Decade Team)
Martin Toft, OF
Hank Kuhlmann, C

 1963
Dave Harvey, 3B
 1964
Gary Wood, OF

Conference awards

 Big 12 Player of the Year
Aaron Senne – 2010
 Big 12 Pitcher of the Year
Max Scherzer – 2005
Aaron Crow – 2008
 Big 12 Freshman of the Year
Trevor Coleman, 2007
 Big 12 Newcomer of the Year
Jody Harris, 1999

 Big 8 Tournament Most Outstanding Player
Curt Brown – 1976
Rob Pietroburgo – 1976
Phil Bradley – 1980
Aaron Jaworowski – 1996
 Big 12 Tournament Most Outstanding Player
Cody Ehlers – 2004
Eric Garcia – 2012

All Big 8

 1958
Ernie Nevers, P
Sonny Siebert, 1B
Bo Toft, RF
Ray Uriarte, 3B
 1959
Ralph Hochgrebe, 2B
John Scowcroft, OF
 1960
Ron Cox, SS
Gene Orf, OF
 1961
George Hulett, 3B
Gene Orf, OF
 1962
Larry Bohannon, P
George Hulett, 3B
Bobby Jenkins, P
Dan Reilly, OF
 1963
Dave Harvey, 3B
Gene McArtor, 1B
Bob Price, 2B
John Sevcik, C
Jack Stroud, P
 1964
Jim Estes, OF
Dave Harvey, 3B
John Sevcik, C
Keith Weber, P
 1965
Bob Robben, SS
Dan Rudanovich, OF
Mike Strode, 2B
 1967
Gene Stephenson, 1B
Ray Thorpe, OF
 1968
Bill Griffin, 1B
Rick Henninger, P

 1969
Del Blunk, OF
Steve Patchin, C
 1970
Steve Patchin, OF
Neil Sloman, OF
 1971
Jack Bastable, 3B
Bill Todd, P
 1972
Jack Bastable, 3B
 1974
Tom Ellis, OF
Mark Thiel, C
 1975
Tom Ellis, OF
 1976
Greg Cypret, SS
Mark Thiel, C
 1977
Greg Cypret, SS
John Kruse, 2B
Rob Pietroburgo, P
 1978
Curt Brown, 1B
Greg Cypret, SS
Rob Pietroburgo, P
 1979
Jim English, 1B
Tom Heckman, P
Tim Laudner, C
 1980
Lindy Duncan, SS
Tom Heckman, P
 1981
Phil Bradley, OF
Tom Heckman, P
Kevin Knop, 2B

 1982
Shane Fairbanks, SS
Roger Johnson, DH
John Marquardt, SS
Kurt Moody, P
 1983
John Marquardt, SS
 1985
Dave Otto, DH
 1986
Marcus Adler, 2B
 1987
Tony Russo, P
Dave Silvestri, SS
 1988
Tim Clark, 2B
Dave Silvestri, SS
 1989
Tim Hawkins, OF
Jon Pittenger, 3B
 1990
John Dettmer, P
Darnel Hawkins, OF
 1991
John Dettmer, P
Joe Winkler, OF
 1992
John Dettmer, P
Rodney Weary, 1B
 1993
Chopper Littrell, OF
Jason Meyhoff, P
 1994
Grant Ingram, DH
 1996
Aaron Jaworowski, 1B

All Big 12

 1998
Ryan Fry, OF
Chris George, P
Griffin Moore, INF
Justin Stine, P
 1999
Jody Harris, P
Justin Stine, P
Aaron Wilson, 3B
 2000
Ryan Stegall, SS
 2002
Cody Ehlers, DH
Jayce Tingler, OF
 2003
Jayce Tingler, OF
Brad Flanders, C
Justin James, P
Ian Kinsler, SS

 2004
Garrett Broshuis, P
Lee Laskowski, OF
Ryan Rallo, OF
 2005
James Boone, OF
Max Scherzer, P
Nathan Culp, P
Hunter Mense, OF
Taylor Parker, P
 2006
Nathan Culp, P
Jacob Priday, OF
 2007
Aaron Crow, P
Jacob Priday, OF
Evan Frey, OF

 2008
Aaron Crow, P
Jacob Priday, DH
Aaron Senne, OF
Trevor Coleman, C
 2009
Greg Folgia, OF
Kyle Gibson, P
 2010
Aaron Senne, 1B
Brett Nicholas, Util
 2011
Jonah Schmidt, DH

All Big 8 Tournament Team

 1976
Curt Brown, 1B
Greg Cypret, SS
Al Hightower, OF
Jim Leavitt, OF
Rob Pietroburgo, P
 1977
Al Hightower, OF
Tim Laudner, C
Tom Bloemke, P
 1978
Al Hightower, OF
Tim Laudner, C
 1980
Phil Bradley, OF
Scott Collins, 3B
Lindy Duncan, SS
Mark Maurer, OF
Kurt Moody, P

 1981
Phil Bradley, OF
Shane Fairbanks, OF
Bill Hance, C
 1983
Bill Hance, C
Shane Fairbanks, OF
John Marquardt, SS
 1984
Nick Rallo, 2B
 1986
Mike Rogers, 1B
 1987
Doug Bock, C
Tim Clark, 2B

 1988
Tim Clark, 2B
Dave Silvestri, SS
 1989
Scott Black, P
Tim Hawkins, OF
Todd Moseley, P
Tim Pinkowski, C
Bard Womack, OF
 1991
Joe Winkler, OF
Shane Meador, C
 1994
Brent Chamberlain, C
 1996
Aaron Jaworowski, 1B
Bryan Seymour, OF

All Big 12 Tournament Team

 2000
Landon Brandes, 3B
 2004
Mark Alexander, P
James Boone, OF
Garrett Broshuis, P
Cody Ehlers, 1B
Lee Laskowski, OF
 2005
James Boone, OF
Jacob Priday, C
Zane Taylor, INF

 2006
Max Scherzer, P
 2007
Brock Bond, 2B
 2008
Jacob Priday, DH
 2009
Ryan Lollis, OF
 2010
Ryan Gebhart, OF

 2011
Kelly Fick, P
Conner Mach, OF
Jonah Schmidt, DH
 2012
Blake Brown, OF
Jeff Emens, P
Eric Garcia, SS
Dane Opel, OF

Current and former major league players

 Joe Bennett
 Phil Bradley
 Dennis Burns
 Byron Browne
 Jeff Cornell
 Jake Crawford
 Aaron Crow
 John Dettmer
 Jay Difani
 Kyle Gibson
 Jay Hankins
 Rick Henninger
 Neal Hertweck
 Tanner Houck
 Charlie James
 Justin James
 Dick Kenworthy
 Ian Kinsler
 Tim Laudner
 Scott Little
 Doug Mathis
 Ron Mathis
 Carl Miles
 Bryce Montes de Oca
 Dennis Musgraves
 John O'Donoghue
 Dave Otto
 Hub Pruett
 Max Scherzer
 Jerry Schoonmaker
 John Sevcik
 Art Shamsky
 Mike Shannon
 Sonny Siebert
 Dave Silvestri
 Bob Smith
 Homer Summa
 Nick Tepesch
 Bill Windle
 Glenn Wright
 Rob Zastryzny

Source: Baseball Reference

Gallery

See also
 List of NCAA Division I baseball programs

References

External links